Marcelo Saralegui Arregín (born 18 May 1971) is a Uruguayan football manager and former player who played as a midfielder.

Saralegui played 33 times for the Uruguay national team between 1992 and 1997. In 1995 he was part of the Uruguay squad that won the Copa América.

Playing career

Club
Saralegui started his professional playing career in 1989 with Nacional, in 1992 he played a part in the clubs championship winning season. Later that year he joined Torino of Italy but he did not have much success there and returned to South America to play in Argentina.

His first club in Argentina was Racing Club de Avellaneda where he played one season before joining Colón de Santa Fe. He played over 100 games for Colón between 1995 and 1999.

In 1999, he joined Independiente, fierce rivals of Racing Club. In 2000, he rejoined Racing Club.

In 2001, he returned to Uruguay to play for Nacional again, and in 2001 he won his second Uruguayan championship. In the final years of his career he played for Fénix and Uruguay Montevideo.

International
He made his debut for Uruguay in a friendly match against Australia (2-0 win) on June 21, 1992 in the Estadio Centenario in Montevideo under coach Luis Alberto Cubilla.

Career statistics

International

Honours

References

External links

 Profile at Tenfield
 Argentine Primera statistics

1971 births
Living people
Footballers from Montevideo
Uruguayan footballers
Uruguayan expatriate footballers
Uruguay international footballers
1993 Copa América players
1995 Copa América players
1997 Copa América players
Association football midfielders
Club Nacional de Football players
Centro Atlético Fénix players
Racing Club de Avellaneda footballers
Uruguay Montevideo players
Club Atlético Colón footballers
Club Atlético Independiente footballers
Torino F.C. players
Uruguayan Primera División players
Serie A players
Argentine Primera División players
Expatriate footballers in Argentina
Expatriate footballers in Italy
Copa América-winning players
Uruguayan people of Basque descent
Uruguayan football managers
Club Sportivo Cerrito managers
Rampla Juniors managers
Club Atlético Colón managers